Major William Drummond Mercer (1796–1871) was a British Army officer, landowner, pastoralist and politician in colonial New South Wales.

Mercer was the only surviving nephew of George Mercer. Major Mercer, having retired from the 16th Lancers, departed Calcutta and  arrived in Hobart in March 1838 along with his cousin, Lieutenant George Duncan Mercer. 
Mercer was a pastoralist with his two cousins, George Duncan Mercer and John Henry Mercer in properties near Geelong. 
Mercer was elected to the district of Port Phillip in the New South Wales Legislative Council in June 1850. He held that seat until it was abolished prior to the creation of Victoria (Australia) as a separate colony. Mercer returned to Scotland and settled in Perthshire.

References 

 

1796 births
1871 deaths
Members of the New South Wales Legislative Council
16th The Queen's Lancers officers
19th-century Australian politicians